Jean-Pierre Tiéhi (born 24 January 2002) is a French professional footballer who plays as a striker for Hamilton Academical, on loan from Fulham.

Early and personal life
Born in Paris, Tiéhi is the son of Ivorian footballer Joel Tiéhi, and the brother of Christ Tiéhi.

Career
Tiéhi moved from Le Havre to English club Fulham in summer 2018. He returned to France on loan in January 2022, signing with Rodez. He made his senior debut for the club on 19 February 2022, one of four new players to do so in that match.

He moved on loan to Scottish club Hamilton Academical in August 2022.

References

2002 births
Living people
French sportspeople of Ivorian descent
French footballers
Le Havre AC players
Fulham F.C. players
Rodez AF players
Hamilton Academical F.C. players
Ligue 2 players
Championnat National 3 players
Association football forwards
French expatriate footballers
French expatriates in England
Expatriate footballers in England
French expatriates in Scotland
Expatriate footballers in Scotland
Black French sportspeople
Scottish Professional Football League players